Sport szelet ("sport slice") is a chocolate bar first produced in Hungary in the 1950s. After the collapse of the socialist government in 1989, Kraft Foods bought the rights to Sport szelet and continued to produce the candy bar with its distinctive half-century old style of packaging.

References

Chocolate
Hungarian cuisine
Products introduced in 1953
Communist nostalgia